Bucculatrix immaculatella is a moth in the family Bucculatricidae. It is found in North America, where it has been recorded from Maine and New Hampshire. It was described in 1875 by Vactor Tousey Chambers.

Adults have been recorded on wing in from June to July.

References

Natural History Museum Lepidoptera generic names catalog

Bucculatricidae
Moths described in 1875
Moths of North America